The Battle of Spahan was fought between the Rashidun Caliphate and the Sasanian Empire in 642. The Arabs were victorious during the battle, where they reportedly killed the Mihran commander Shahrvaraz Jadhuyih. After the battle, the Arabs made peace with Fadhusfan, the governor of the city. According to Abu No'aym, many people were killed or enslaved after the conquest and the settlement pattern of the region changed. Isfahan capitulated by 644 after a few failed revolts and treaties for paying taxes and tributes in exchange for military protection were drawn up.

References

Sources 

Spahan
Spahan
Spahan
Muslim conquest of Persia
642
640s in the Sasanian Empire
640s in the Rashidun Caliphate